This is a list of listed buildings in Køge Municipality, Denmark.

The list

4140 Borup

4600 Køge

4681 Herfølge

References

External links

 Danish Agency of Culture
 Køge Arkiverne

 
Koge